Comitas makiyamai is a species of sea snail, a marine gastropod mollusc in the family Pseudomelatomidae, the turrids and allies.

Distribution
This marine species occurs off Japan

References

 Shuto, Tsugio. "Conacean gastropods from the Miyazaki group." Memoirs of the Faculty of Science, Kyushu University Ser. D Geology 11.2 (1961).

makiyamai
Gastropods described in 1961